Naughton is a village and former civil parish, now in the civil parish of Nedging-with-Naughton, in the Babergh district, in the county of Suffolk, England. It was historically within the Cosford Hundred of Suffolk. The civil parish was merged with Nedging in 1935 to create Nedging-with-Naughton. In 1931 the civil parish had a population of 98.

Naughton is formed from the junction of two roads, the Whatfield Road which comes in from the south-west and heads north to Nedging Tye and New Road which comes in from the south-east. St. Mary's church is a 14th-century flint built church stands at the centre of the village, just west of this junction.

History
Sir Henry Adair was lord of the manor in the past.

Present day
It lies just to the south of RAF Wattisham. There is one pub in the village, the Wheelhouse (formerly Wheeler's Arms), that dates from the 17th century.

There are four farms in the area: Cooper's Farm (to the north), Brickhouse Farm (to the east), Fidget's Farm (to the south-west), and High Tree Farm (to the south).

References

External links
Suffolk CAMRA
GENUKI
The Wheelhouse at Naughton

Villages in Suffolk
Former civil parishes in Suffolk
Babergh District